Wang Guangtao (born June 1943) is a Chinese politician who served as minister of Construction from 2001 to 2008 and chairperson of the National People's Congress Environment Protection and Resources Conservation Committee from 2008 to 2013. He was a member of the 16th Central Committee of the Chinese Communist Party. He was a member of the Standing Committee of the 11th National People's Congress.

Biography
Wang was born in Shanghai, in June 1943, while his ancestral home in Xiuning County, Anhui. In 1960, he entered Tongji University, majoring in the Department of Construction. After university in 1965, he became a technician at Xuzhou Urban Construction Bureau (later renamed Xuzhou Urban and Rural Development Commission), and served until 1984. After resuming the college entrance examination in 1978, he received his Master of Engineering degree from Tongji University in 1981. He joined the Chinese Communist Party (CCP) in December 1983. He was vice mayor of Xuzhou in 1984, and held that office until 1989.

In December 2001, he was transferred to the Ministry of Construction and appointed director and chief engineer of the Urban Construction Department, that posts he kept until 1995.

In 1995, he was assigned to northeast China's Heilongjiang province and named acting mayor of the capital city Harbin.

He was recalled to Beijing in 1998 and was chosen as vice mayor, a position he held until November 2001. He became minister of Construction in December 2001, and served until March 2008, when he took office as chairperson of the National People's Congress Environment Protection and Resources Conservation Committee.

References

1943 births
Living people
Tongji University alumni
Academic staff of Tongji University
Academic staff of Tsinghua University
Academic staff of Beijing University of Technology
People's Republic of China politicians from Shanghai
Chinese Communist Party politicians from Shanghai
Members of the Standing Committee of the 11th National People's Congress
Members of the 16th Central Committee of the Chinese Communist Party